Osnos is a surname. Notable people with the surname include:

Evan Osnos (born 1976), American journalist and author
Peter Osnos (born 1943), American journalist and publisher, father of Evan
Vyacheslav Osnos (1935–2009), Russian chess player